The Light is a 1988 studio album released by Afrika Bambaataa and Family. The album features other stars of the 1980s, such as UB40, Jaki Graham, and Boy George.  The lead single "Reckless" features UB40 and was a Top 20 hit in the UK peaking at #17. The album itself didn't chart in the UK.

Track listing

Singles 
"Reckless" was arranged and produced by John Robie. Vocals were provided by Afrika Bambaataa, Lizzie Tear, Malibu and UB40, who also provided all instrumentation. It was Afrika Bambaataa's second highest charting single in the UK after "Afrika Shox" which he released in 1999 with Leftfield.

References

1988 albums
Afrika Bambaataa albums
EMI America Records albums